Parachernes virginicus is a species of pseudoscorpion of the family Chernetidae.

References

Chernetidae
Animals described in 1895